Ponce Island is an island  east of Ortiz Island and  southeast of Largo Island in the Duroch Islands. Named by Martin Halpern, leader of the University of Wisconsin field party during geological mapping of this area, 1961–62. Named for Lautaro Ponce, Chief of Antarctic Operations, University of Chile, in appreciation for Chilean logistical support provided to the Wisconsin field party.

See also 
 List of Antarctic and sub-Antarctic islands

Islands of the Duroch Islands